The 2020–21 season will be the 58th season of competitive association football in Algeria. The Algerian Football Federation had endorses the change of the competition system by increasing the number of clubs from 16 to 20, as for the second division to 36 clubs from two groups Central East and Central West from 18 clubs also became the number of professional clubs 18 instead of 32 starting from the season 2020–21.

Competitions

Promotion and relegation

National teams

League season

Ligue Professionnelle 1

Amateur Division Two

Amateur Division Three

Inter-Régions Division

Ligue Régional I

National Cups

Algerian Cup 
This competition was cancelled.

Algerian League Cup

Women's football

Algerian Women's Championship

Algerian Women's Championship D2

Algerian Women's Cup

References